IRIB Tamasha (Shibkâhi-ye Temasha; English: View channel) has been a national TV channel in Iran. It was launched on 13 February 2013 and re-aired various TV series previously aired on IRIB, until 17 December 2014 that the channel was closed and merged into Namayesh. But later, after IRIB TV5 became provincial again on 10 August 2016, Tamasha was reformed, replacing the earlier-launched Tehran TV.

Series 
Alarm für Cobra 11 – Die Autobahnpolizei
Sherlock (TV series)
Old Way
Sherlock Holmes (1984 TV series)
Carousel
The Enigma of Shah
Prophet Joseph
Jumong

Logos

References

External links

Islamic Republic of Iran Broadcasting
Mass media in Tehran
Persian-language television stations
Television stations in Iran